Ben Berend (born 29 June 1995) is an American Nordic combined skier. He competed in the 2018 Winter Olympics. He is now a realtor in Steamboat Springs, Colorado.

References

1995 births
Living people
Nordic combined skiers at the 2018 Winter Olympics
American male Nordic combined skiers
Olympic Nordic combined skiers of the United States